Virginia's 23rd Senate district is one of 40 districts in the Senate of Virginia. It has been represented by Republican Stephen Newman since 1996.

Geography
District 23 includes all of Botetourt and Craig Counties as well as parts of Bedford County, Campbell County, Roanoke County, and the City of Lynchburg.

The district overlaps with Virginia's 5th, 6th, and 9th congressional districts, and with the 8th, 17th, 19th, 22nd, 23rd, and 59th districts of the Virginia House of Delegates. Its western edge borders the state of West Virginia.

Recent election results

2019

2015

2011

Federal and statewide results in District 23

Historical results
All election results below took place prior to 2011 redistricting, and thus were under different district lines.

2007

2003

1999

1995

References

Virginia Senate districts
Bedford County, Virginia
Botetourt County, Virginia
Campbell County, Virginia
Craig County, Virginia
Lynchburg, Virginia
Roanoke County, Virginia